Samman may refer to:

People
Muhammad as-Samman al-Madani (born 1718), a Muslim scholar who was the caretaker of the city of Medina and a founder of the Sufi Sammaniyya Tariqa, 
Samman baronets, of Routh in the East Riding of the County of York, a title in the Baronetage of the United Kingdom
Ghada al-Samman (born 1942), Syrian writer, journalist and novelist 
Henry Samman, 1st Baronet (c.1850 – 1928), British shipowner
Josh Samman (1988–2016), American mixed martial artist
Baha Samman (Born 1980) Syrian Graphics Artist 

Archbishop Gerasimos Samman

Archbishop Gerasimos Samman, B.C.Permalink
(1721.12 – 1732)
Consecrated Bishop: (1721.12.26)
(Died 1754)
Archbishop of Aleppo of the Greek-Melkites (Syria) (1721.12 – 1732)

Indian awards
Samman means award in Hindi and other South Asian languages. It may refer to:

Awadh Samman, award constituted by the Government of Uttar Pradesh, to honor exceptional and meritorious contribution in their chosen field/profession
Kalidas Samman, annual arts award presented by the government of Madhya Pradesh in India
Pravasi Bharatiya Samman, award constituted by the Ministry of Overseas Indian Affairs, Government of India in conjunction with the Pravasi Bharatiya Divas (Non-Resident Indian Day), to honour exceptional and meritorious contribution in their chosen field/profession
Saraswati Samman, annual award for outstanding prose or poetry literary works in any 22 Indian language listed in Schedule VIII of the Constitution of India
Shatayu Samman, award given to persons who lived for a century, by the Government of Madhya Pradesh, India
Shyamal Sen Smriti Samman, award given for outstanding work in Bengali art, theater and film
Tulsi Samman, annual arts award presented by the government of Madhya Pradesh state in India
Vyas Samman, literary award in India